Jacqueline Simpson (born 1930) is a prolific, award-winning British researcher and author on folklore.

Career
Simpson studied English Literature and Medieval Icelandic at Bedford College, University of London. She has been, at various times, Editor, Secretary, and President of the Folklore Society. She was awarded the Society's Coote Lake Research Medal in 2008. In 2010 she was appointed Visiting Professor of Folklore at the Sussex Centre of Folklore, Fairy Tales and Fantasy at the University of Chichester, West Sussex. She has a particular interest in local legends (as opposed to international fairy tales), and has published collections of this genre from Iceland, Scandinavia in general, and England (the latter in collaboration with the late Jennifer Westwood). She has also written on the folklore of various English regions, and was co-author with Steve Roud of the Penguin Dictionary of English Folklore.

She has been a point of reference for Terry Pratchett since he met her at a book signing in 1997. Pratchett, who was then researching his novel Carpe Jugulum, was asking everyone in the queue how many "magpie" rhymes they knew; and while most people gave one answer – the theme from the TV series Magpie – Simpson was able to supply considerably more. According to Pratchett's version of their conversation, there were "about nineteen", but she suspects this is creative embroidery. Their encounter eventually led to collaboration.

Personal life
Simpson lives in West Sussex, England.

Selected publications

Articles 

 Simpson, Jacqueline (1966-03-01). "Otherworld Adventures in an Icelandic Saga". Folklore. 77 (1): 1–20. . .
 Simpson, Jacqueline (1967-09-01). "Some Scandinavian Sacrifices". Folklore. 78 (3): 190–202. . .
 Simpson, Jacqueline (1969-06-01). "Legends of Chanctonbury Ring". Folklore. 80 (2): 122–131. . .
 Simpson, Jacqueline (1973-09-01). "Sussex Local Legends". Folklore. 84 (3): 206–223. . .
 Simpson, Jacqueline (1974-03-01). "The Function of Folklore in 'Jane Eyre' and 'Wuthering Heights'". Folklore. 85 (1): 47–61. . .
 Simpson, Jacqueline (1975-09-01). "Nixon's Prophecies in Their Historical Setting". Folklore. 86 (3–4): 201–207. . .
 Simpson, Jacqueline (1978-01-01). "Fifty British Dragon Tales: An Analysis". Folklore. 89 (1): 79–93. . .
 Simpson, Jacqueline (1979-01-01). "'Wændel' and the Long Man of Wilmington". Folklore. 90 (1): 25–28. . .
 Simpson, Jacqueline (1981-01-01). "Rationalized Motifs in Urban Legends". Folklore. 92 (2): 203–207. . .
 Simpson, Jacqueline (1982-01-01). "Obituary: Peter Mason Opie, M.A. (1918–1982)". Folklore. 93 (2): 223–223. . .
 Simpson, Jacqueline (1983-01-01). "Obituary: Professor William R. Bascom (1912–1981)". Folklore. 94 (2): 251–251. . .
 Simpson, Jacqueline (1985-01-01). "Obituary: Georges Henri Rivière, 1897–1985". Folklore. 96 (2): 255–255. . .
 Simpson, Jacqueline (1986-01-01). "God's visible judgements: the Christian dimension of landscape legends". Landscape History. 8 (1): 53–58. . .
 Simpson, Jacqueline (1989-01-01). "Folklore in Folklore: Trends Since 1959". Folklore. 100 (1): 3–8. . .
 Simpson, Jacqueline (1991-01-01). "'Be Bold, but not Too Bold': Female Courage in Some British and Scandinavian Legends". Folklore. 102 (1): 16–30. . .
 Simpson, Jacqueline (1994-01-01). "Margaret Murray: Who Believed Her, and Why?". Folklore. 105 (1–2): 89–96. . .
 Simpson, Jacqueline (1995-01-01). ""The Weird Sisters Wandering": Burlesque Witchery in Montgomerie's Flyting". Folklore. 106 (1–2): 9–20. . .
 Simpson, Jacqueline (1995-01-01). "Ellen Ettlinger, 1902–1994". Folklore. 106 (1–2): 86–86. . .
 Simpson, Jacqueline (1996-01-01). "Witches and Witchbusters". Folklore. 107 (1–2): 5–18. . .
 Simpson, Jacqueline (1997-01-01). ""The Rules of Folklore" in the Ghost Stories of M.R. James". Folklore. 108 (1–2): 9–18. . .
 Simpson, Jacqueline (2006-01-01). "Boundaries for Ghosts: A Technique in Folk Exorcism". Folk Life. 45 (1): 70–76. . .
 Simpson, Jacqueline (2003-03-01). "Repentant soul or walking corpse? Debatable apparitions in medieval England". Folklore. 114 (3): 389–402. . .
 Simpson, Jacqueline (2005-08-01). "The Miller's Tomb: Facts, Gossip, and Legend". Folklore. 116 (2): 189–200. . .
 Simpson, Jacqueline (2006-08-01). "Hilda Ellis Davidson (1914–2006)". Folklore. 117 (2): 215–216. . .
 Simpson, Jacqueline (2008-08-01). "Seeking the Lore of the Land". Folklore. 119 (2): 131–141. . .
 Simpson, Jacqueline (2011-04-01). "On the Ambiguity of Elves". Folklore. 122 (1): 76–83. . .
 Simpson, Jacqueline (2015-05-04). "Sir Terry Pratchett OBE (1948–2015)". Folklore. 126 (2): 232–234. . .
 Simpson, Jacqueline (2017-07-03). "Venetia Newall (1935–2017)". Folklore. 128 (3): 316–317. . .

Books 
 Simpson, Jacqueline (1965). The Northmen Talk. A Choice of Tales from Iceland, Phoenix House/Dent, & University of Wisconsin Press
 Simpson, Jacqueline (1965). The Northmen talk. A choice of tales from Iceland. Translated and with introduction by Jacqueline Simpson, with a foreword by Eric Linklater. London; Madison: Phoenix House ; University of Wisconsin Press. .
 Garmonsway, George Norman; Simpson, Jacqueline (1968). Beowulf and its analogues. Translated by G. N. Garmonsway and Jacqueline Simpson. Including Archaeology and Beowulf by Hilda Ellis Davidson. With plates. London; New York: J. M. Dent & Sons ; E. P. Dutton & Co. .
 Partridge, Eric; Simpson, Jacqueline (1972). The Penguin dictionary of historical slang. Harmondsworth. Penguin Books. . .
 Simpson, Jacqueline; Galsworthy, Gay (1973). The folklore of Sussex. London: Batsford. . .
 Simpson, Jacqueline (1976). The folklore of the Welsh border. London: B.T. Batsford. . .
 Simpson, Jacqueline (1980). British dragons. London: Batsford. . .
 Simpson, Jacqueline; Wilson, Eva (1987). Everyday life in the Viking age. New York: Dorset Press. . .
 Simpson, Jacqueline (1987). European mythology. New York: P. Bedrick Books. . .
 Simpson, Jacqueline; Gowdy, Caroline (1989). Scandinavian Folktales (Penguin Folklore Library / Puffin) 
 Simpson, Jacqueline; Roud, Stephen (2003). A dictionary of English folklore. Oxford; New York: Oxford University Press. . .
 Simpson, Jacqueline (2004) Icelandic Folktales and Legends (Revealing History) 2nd ed., NPI Media Group,  
 Simpson, Jacqueline; Westwood, Jennifer. (2005; reissued 2006). The Lore of the Land: a Guide to England's Legends, from Spring-heeled Jack to the Witches of Warboys, Penguin  
 The Folklore of Discworld (with Terry Pratchett), Doubleday (2008) . 2nd, enlarged edition. Corgi 2009 . 3rd enlarged edition, Corgi (2014)  (same ISBN as 2nd edition)
 Simpson, Jacqueline (2010). Elves: nasty or nice?. Wincanton, Somerset: Discworld Emporium :. .
 Simpson, Jacqueline (2010). Green Men and White Swans: the Folklore of British Pub Names, Random House Books

References

1930 births
Living people
Folklore writers
English folklorists
Women folklorists
Alumni of Bedford College, London
Old Norse studies scholars
Germanic studies scholars
Writers on Germanic paganism
Presidents of the Folklore Society
20th-century English women writers
20th-century English writers
21st-century English women writers